Poggenkrug is a village in Willen, a borough of Wittmund in German Lower Saxony. Poggenkrug has about 50 inhabitants and borders at the "Alten Postweg" (which goes from Wittmund to Ardorf) and at the Northern forest of Wittmund. In Poggenkrug is the source of the Töpperschloot.

History 
Willen, with Poggenkrug and other hamlets, was incorporated in 1972 by Wittmund. The village was recorded on maps already in 1730. In 1945, Tannenkamp became part of Poggenkrug.

Towns and villages in East Frisia
Wittmund (district)